Pop is a Pakistani children's free-to-air television network in Pakistan similar to the United Kingdom feed. The channel was launched on June 3, 2018. It dubs its programmings in Urdu. The channel is available on Paksat-1R and Apstar 7 in HD.

History
The channel was launched on June 3, 2018  as a free-to-air channel broadcasting cartoons in Urdu. In March 2020 Pop started to show HD format broadcasting.

Programming
ALVINNN!!! and the Chipmunks
Care Bears: Welcome to Care-a-Lot
Big Top Academy
Winx Club
Lego Ninjago
Littlest Pet Shop
My Little Pony: Friendship Is Magic
 Transformers: Cyberverse
Barbie: Dream House Adventures
Grizzy And The Lemmings
Trolls: The Beat Goes On!

Former Programming
44 Cats
Nexo Knights
Talking Tom and Friends
Pokemon Journeys
Dragon Ball Super
Spirit Riding Free
Captain Flinn and the Pirate Dinosaurs
Power Rangers Beast Morphers
Sonic Boom
Lego Elves

Related channels

Pop (stylised as POP) is a British free-to-air children's television channel owned by Narrative Entertainment UK Limited. Its target audience is 8 to 12-year old children.
It made its debut in the UK in 2002. In Pop's early years, links were presented by Rorry, a lime green dragon with a Scottish accent, who was animated live. He was accompanied by Purrdy, a dragon/cat hybrid who also appeared in the original Tricky programme which had aired on ITV. Originally, the network focused on music videos, with animated programming also being part of the schedule, but with the numerous music video network options on British television at the time, this focus was quickly abandoned in 2004, when the animated content became much more prominent. Music videos continued to be carried on and off until 2007, before eventually being abandoned entirely. Pop was originally launched on 1 October 2002 by CSC Media Group as Toons and Tunes. Toons and Tunes was then later re-branded as Pop in May 2003.

References

Children's television channels in Pakistan
Television channels and stations established in 2018
Pakistani subsidiaries of foreign companies
Television stations in Karachi
English-language television stations in Pakistan